Sherrod Coates (born December 22, 1978) is a former American football linebacker. He played for the Cleveland Browns from 2003 to 2004 and for the Edmonton Eskimos in 2006.

References

1978 births
Living people
American football linebackers
Western Kentucky Hilltoppers football players
Cleveland Browns players
Edmonton Elks players